The Minister of Militia and Defence was the federal government minister in charge of the volunteer army units in Canada, the Canadian Militia.

From 1855 to 1906, the minister was responsible for Canadian militia units only, as the British Army was still stationed in Canada. From 1906 to 1923, the minister was in charge of the Department of Militia and Defence (Canada). After 1923, the position was merged with the Minister of the Naval Service and the Minister of Aviation into the new position of Minister of National Defence.  The Minister of National Defence became responsible for the Canadian Militia, the Royal Canadian Navy and, from 1924, the Royal Canadian Air Force.

List of Ministers

Pre-Confederation (1855–1867)

The following individuals were named the Minister of Militia and Defence for the Province of Canada. 

Key:

Post-Confederation (1867–1922)
The following individuals were named the Minister of Militia and Defence for Canada. 

Key:

Ministers with military experience

Several individuals that served as the Minister of Militia and Defence have served with the Canadian Militia. They include:
 Private John Alexander Macdonald, Sedentary Militia during 1837 Rebellion
 Lieutenant Étienne-Paschal Taché, 5th Battalion of Select Embodied Militia, Chasseurs Canadiens Militia
 Lieutenant Colonel David Tisdale, 39th Norfolk Battalion of Infantry
 Assistant Surgeon Frederick William Borden, 68th (Kings) Battalion of Infantry, Non-Permanent Active Militia
 Colonel Sir Sam Hughes, 45th Canadian Volunteer Militia (45th West Durham Battalion of Infantry, later The Victoria and Haliburton Regiment and lastly as 45th Medium Battery, RCA) merged into what is 50th Field Artillery Regiment (The Prince of Wales Rangers), RCA) in 1960; Canadian volunteer to the British Army
 Major Sydney Chilton Mewburn, Commanding Officer of Royal Hamilton Light Infantry, Permanent Active Militia

Deputy Minister of Militia and Defence

 Eugène Fiset 1906-1922

Fiset was a retired as Surgeon Colonel of Royal Canadian Regiment

See also

 Minister of Aviation
 Minister of the Naval Service
 Minister of National Defence
 Minister of National Defence for Naval Services
 Minister of National Defence for Air
 Minister of Overseas Military Forces

References

Militia and Defence
Military history of Canada
Canadian Militia